Mohammad Rasoulof (born November 16, 1972) is an Iranian independent filmmaker. He is known for several award-winning films, including The Twilight (2002), Iron Island (2005), Goodbye (2011), Manuscripts Don't Burn (2013), A Man of Integrity (2017) and There Is No Evil (2020). He won the Golden Bear at the 2020 Berlin Film Festival for There Is No Evil.

He has been arrested several times and had his passport confiscated, as the nature and content of his films has brought him into conflict with the Iranian Government.

Early life and education

Mohammad Rasoulof was born on 16 November 1972 in Shiraz, Iran.

He has graduated with a bachelor's degree in sociology from Shiraz University, and he has studied film editing at Soore University, Tehran.

Career

His first feature-length film, The Twilight (Gagooman), was released in 2002 and was awarded with the Crystal Simorgh for the Best First Film at the Fajr Film Festival in Tehran. His second feature, Iron Island (Jazire-ye ahani), was released in 2005. His feature The White Meadows (Keshtzarha-ye sepid) was released in 2009.

Goodbye (Be omid-e didar) premiered at the 2011 Cannes Film Festival in the section Un Certain Regard and won the prize for directing. His film Manuscripts Don't Burn was also screened in the Un Certain Regard section at the 2013 Cannes Film Festival where it won the FIPRESCI Prize. A Man of Integrity won the top prize in the Un Certain Regard section at the Cannes Film Festival in 2017.

There Is No Evil was awarded the Golden Bear in the main competition section at the 70th Berlin International Film Festival in 2020, and the Sydney Film Prize in 2021.

Legal problems

In 2010, Rasoulof was arrested on set and accused of filming without a permit. He was sentenced to six years in prison, later reduced to one year.

In September 2017 his passport was confiscated upon his return to Iran, meaning he became mamnu'-ol-xoruğ, i.e. banned from leaving the country. Furthermore, he was ordered to attend a court hearing.

On 23 July 2019, Rasoulof was convicted by the Islamic Revolutionary Court of Iran to one-year imprisonment and a two-year ban on leaving the country and on participation in social and political activity because of his film A Man of Integrity. He is accused of "gathering and collusion against national security and of propaganda against the system". In August 2019 Rasoulof appealed the verdict. On his way to the court, in an act of professional solidarity, he and his lawyer were accompanied by some of the most renowned Iranian filmmakers, including Kianoush Ayyari, Majid Barzegar, Reza Dormishian, Asghar Farhadi, Bahman Farmanara, Rakhshān Banietemad, Fatemeh Motamed-Arya, Jafar Panahi, and Hasan Pourshirazi.

On 4 March 2020, Rasoulof was sentenced to one year in prison for three of his movies, which were considered "propaganda against the system". The verdict also included a ban on making films for two years. He has stated that he intends to appeal the decision and will not turn himself in, considering the ongoing coronavirus pandemic, which had already led Iran to release 54,000 prisoners temporarily in order to prevent the virus from spreading.

Filmography

Awards and nominations

References

External links
 
 International Campaign for Human Rights in Iran blog - 21 December 2010: Panahi's Lawyer Concerned About Severe, Disproportionate Sentence
 Slant Magazine  - Articles tagged "Mohammad Rasoulof"
 Silverdocs Film Festival - Biographical information for  "Mohammad Rasoulof"
 Kino International - US distributor's presskit for Rasoulof's feature, "Iron Island"

Iranian film directors
Living people
1972 births
Directors of Golden Bear winners
Best Director Golden Orange Award winners
Golden Bear winners